Move Radio is a brand of adult contemporary radio stations heard across Canada. The network was launched on December 27, 2020, by Bell Media. The launch of the network involved a re-branding of eleven radio stations across Canada, five in Ontario, four in British Columbia, one in Nova Scotia and one in New Brunswick.

The launch of this network also involved the flipping of CJMG-FM's Top 40/CHR format to AC, as well the CHR format of CIBX-FM to hot AC. All stations adopted the slogan Today's Best Variety, which is similar to other stations that use AC and hot AC formats, and have since then dropped their former brandings, including two stations with the "EZ Rock" brand.

During November and December, "Move" plays all-Christmas music.

Programming
From the day of the launch, all stations would run jockless until January 4, 2021, with local staff returning on that day, including each station's local morning show hosts. On weekdays from 9:00 a.m. to 5:00 p.m. beginning on January 4, 2021, all stations would air 60 minutes of commercial-free music every hour. On weekends, these stations would air a variety of local programming, along with the syndicated American Top 40.

On weekdays from 10:00 a.m. to 2:00 p.m., most Move stations would be voice-tracked from their local markets, whereas those in Ottawa, Halifax, Fredericton, Peterborough, Kingston, Brockville and St. Catharines would be hosted by CHUM-FM's Ashley Greco. As a result, former midday host of Ottawa's station, Katharine Dines, moved into the afternoon drive slot. Trinette Atkinson, former afternoon drive host of Kingston's Pure Country station, has also moved into the afternoon drive slot of the city's "Move" station from 2:00 p.m. to 7:00 p.m.

Stations

References

External links
Move Radio

Canadian radio networks
2020 establishments in Canada
Radio stations in Canada
Bell Media